Sebastián Gómez Pérez (born 1 November 1983) is a footballer who plays as a left winger for Primera Divisió club UE Engordany.

A Uruguayan national born in Spain while his father played football there, he represents Andorra at international level.

Early life
Gómez was born to Uruguayan parents in Murcia, Spain in 1983. At the time, his footballer father was playing there and would move to Andorra some time later. He spent part of his childhood in Andorra and his family moved back to Uruguay when he was still very young.

Career
Gómez started playing baby fútbol in Deportivo Uruguayo. He transitioned to traditional football during his youth and played for CSD Villa Española. At 18, he was relocated once again to Andorra and has played for FC Santa Coloma, Principat, Rànger's, Sant Julià, FC Andorra and UE Engordany.

International career
Gómez made his international debut for Andorra in 2008.

References

1983 births
Living people
Association football wingers
Footballers from Murcia
Uruguayan footballers
Villa Española players
Uruguayan emigrants to Andorra
Naturalised citizens of Andorra
Andorran footballers
Andorra international footballers
Andorran people of Uruguayan descent
Sportspeople of Uruguayan descent
FC Santa Coloma players
CE Principat players
FC Rànger's players
UE Sant Julià players
FC Andorra players
UE Engordany players